Duit on Mon Dei is the eleventh album by Harry Nilsson. The original title for this album was God's Greatest Hits but RCA didn't approve. The title is a punning spelling of "Do It On Monday," playing on the British Monarchy's motto Dieu et mon droit (God and my right). The pun was originally used on the cover of Ringo Starr's 1973 album Ringo.

Duit on Mon Dei marks the first time Nilsson acted as his own producer. Due to the record's eclectic sonics, critic Robert Christgau (negatively) likened Nilsson's production style to "an audio salesman". Despite mixed reception upon release, The A.V. Club retrospectively dubbed Duit on Mon Dei "vastly underrated".

Track listing
All songs written by Harry Nilsson, except where noted

 "Jesus Christ You're Tall" – 1:20 (demo version; re-recorded on Sandman)
 "It's a Jungle Out There" – 3:57
 "Down by the Sea" – 2:30
 "Kojak Columbo" – 3:30
 "Easier for Me" – 2:30 (previously recorded by Ringo Starr as "Easy for Me" on Goodnight Vienna)
 "Turn Out the Light" – 2:27
 "Salmon Falls" (Nilsson, Klaus Voormann) – 4:10
 "Puget Sound" – 2:22
 "What's Your Sign" (featuring Gloria Jones and the Zodiac Singers) – 2:50 
 "Home" – 3:32
 "Good for God" – 3:23 (re-recorded later for In God We Tru$t.)

The 8-track tape version (RCA APS1-0817) included excerpts from "Salmon Falls" placed throughout Programs 1 and 2, and then in full length at the beginning of Program 3, as well as "Turn Out The Light (Reprise)" closing the album at the end of Program 4.  None of the excerpted versions of "Salmon Falls" or "Turn Out The Light (Reprise)" appear on any other format of the album, nor are there any such versions included with compilation albums or non-album singles:
Program 1: Salmon Falls : Jesus Christ You're Tall : Salmon Falls : It's a Jungle Out There : Salmon Falls : Down By The Sea
Program 2: Kojak Columbo : Easier For Me : Salmon Falls : Turn Out The Light
Program 3: Salmon Falls : Puget Sound : What's Your Sign
Program 4: Home : Good For God : Turn Out The Light (Reprise)

Personnel 

 Harry Nilsson – vocals, piano (1, 11)
 Gloria Jones – vocals (9)
 The Zodiac Singers – vocals (9)
 Jesse Ed Davis – guitar (2, 3, 4, 6, 8, 9, 10, 11)
 Danny Kootch – guitar (2, 3, 4, 6, 8, 9, 10, 11)
 Dennis Budimir – guitar (6)
 Jim Keltner – drums (2, 3, 4, 6, 7, 8, 9, 10, 11)
 Ringo Starr – drums (4), vocals (11)
 Robert Greenidge – steel drums (2, 3, 4, 6, 7, 8, 10, 11)
 Klaus Voormann – bass (2, 3, 4, 6, 7, 8, 9, 10, 11)
 Lyle Ritz - bass (7)
 Van Dyke Parks – piano (2, 3, 6, 8, 10), synthesizer (8)
 Dr. John – piano (4)
 Jane Getz – piano (7, 9)
 Fredric Myrow – organ (2), orchestration (6)
 Bobby Keys – saxophone (2, 4, 8, 10, 11), tenor saxophone (3, 6, 9)
 Trevor Lawrence – saxophone (2, 4, 6, 8, 10, 11), soprano saxophone (3), tenor saxophone (9)
 Gene Cipriano – saxophone (2, 4), baritone saxophone (6, 9, 10), tenor saxophone (11)
 Charles Dinwiddie – saxophone (2, 10)
 Johnny Rotella – baritone saxophone (3, 6)
 Clifford "Bud" Shank – soprano saxophone (3)
 Martin M. Krystall – tenor saxophone (6)
 Steve Douglas – tenor saxophone (9)
 Jerry Jumonville – baritone saxophone (10)
 Tommy Shepard – trombone (6)
 Lew McCreary - trombone (6)
 Tony Terran – trumpet (6)
 Malcolm McNab – trumpet (6)
 Jay Migliori - flute (2)
 Joey DeAguero – marimba (2, 4, 8)
 John Bergamo – marimba (6)
 Doug Dillard – banjo (4)
 Gene Estes – percussion (3), timpani (7), shakers (9)
 Milt Holland – percussion (4), cimbalom (6)
 Emmett Kennedy – percussion (3, 4)
 Carl McKnight - percussion (11)
 Pat Murphy – percussion (2, 11), congas (4)
 Gayle Levant – harp (2)
 Denzil Laughton – harp (6)
 Gordon Howard Marrow – viola (6)
 The Perry Botkin Orchestra – orchestra (3, 7)
 The Jim Price Orchestra – strings (5)
 Perry Botkin, Jr. – arrangements and conducting (3, 7, 9)
 Jim Price – arrangement and conducting (5)

References

External links
 Origin of "Duit On Mon Dei" by Curtis Armstrong and Diane Nilsson

Harry Nilsson albums
1975 albums
Albums arranged by Perry Botkin Jr.
RCA Records albums